Troglovitrea is a monotypic genus of gastropods belonging to the family Pristilomatidae. The only species is Troglovitrea argintarui.

The species is found in Romania.

References

Pristilomatidae